The 2006 EHF European Women's Handball Championship was held in Sweden from 7 to 17 December. It was won by Norway after beating Russia 27–24 in the final match.

This championship was also the European qualifying event for 2008 Olympics, and Norway earned a spot at the 2008 Games for being the European champion. If Norway also becomes the 2007 World champion, the 2nd place team will qualify for the Olympics. In addition, the 1 or 2 (if Europe finishes in the top 2 continents at the world championship) best ranked teams in this championship, which are outside top 7 at the world championship, will participate at the Olympic qualifying tournament.

Venues
The European Championships will be held in the following cities:
Skövde, Skövde Arena (Preliminary Group A)
Malmö, Baltiska Hallen (Preliminary Group D)
Gothenburg, Scandinavium (Preliminary Group B, Main Group 1)
Stockholm, Hovet (Preliminary Group C, Main Group 2, Final Round)

Qualification

Note: Bold indicates champion for that year. Italic indicates host for that year.

Draw
The draw was held on 6 July 2006 in Göteborg, Sweden.

Competition format
Preliminary round: 16 teams are divided into four groups. They play each other in a single round robin system, so each team plays three matches. A win is worth two points, while a draw is worth one point. The top three teams from each group advance to the main round.
Main round: 12 teams are divided in two groups. They play against the teams they didn't play in the preliminary round, so each team plays 3 matches. All points from the preliminary round, except the points gained against the 4th place team in the preliminary group, are carried forward into the main round. Same round robin rules apply as in the preliminary round. Top 2 teams from each group advance to the Semifinals, while the third placed team from each group advances to the 5th-6th Place Play-off.
Final round: 6 teams play in the final weekend of the championships. 3rd place teams from the main round play in the 5th-6th Place Play-off. Other teams play in the semifinals. Losers of the semifinals advance to the 3rd-4th Place Play-off, and winners advance to the Final.

Squads

Preliminary round

Group A

Group B

Group C

Group D

Main round

Group I

Group II

Knockout stage

Bracket

Fifth place game

Semifinals

Third place game

Final

Ranking and statistics

Final ranking

All-Star team
Goalkeeper: 
Left wing: 
Left back: 
Pivot: 
Centre back: 
Right back: 
Right wing: 
Best defense player: 
Most valuable player: 
Source: EHF

Top goalscorers

Source: EHF

Top goalkeepers

Source: EHF

References

External links
Official website 

European Women's Handball Championship
International handball competitions hosted by Sweden
2006 in Swedish women's sport
Women's handball in Sweden
European Women's Handball Championship
December 2006 sports events in Europe
International sports competitions in Stockholm
International sports competitions in Malmö
International sports competitions in Gothenburg
Sports competitions in Skövde
2000s in Stockholm
2000s in Gothenburg
2000s in Malmö